Østen Gottlieb Reimar Riefling (4 December 1898 – 22 May 1981) was a Norwegian classical pianist,  pedagogist and music critic, a brother of pianist Robert Riefling. He made his concert debut in Dresden in 1922, and toured in Germany and Scandinavia.

Selected works

References

1898 births
1981 deaths
Musicians from Oslo
Norwegian classical pianists
Norwegian music critics
20th-century classical pianists